The United States Department of Education is a Cabinet-level department of the United States government. It began operating on May 4, 1980, having been created after the Department of Health, Education, and Welfare was split into the Department of Education and the Department of Health and Human Services by the Department of Education Organization Act, which President Jimmy Carter signed into law on October 17, 1979.

The Department of Education is administered by the United States Secretary of Education. It has 4,400 employees - the smallest staff of the Cabinet agencies - and an annual budget of $68 billion. The President's 2023 Budget request is for 88.3 billion, which includes funding for children with disabilities (IDEA), pandemic recovery, early childhood education, Pell Grants, Title I, work assistance, among other programs. Its official abbreviation is ED ("DOE" refers to the United States Department of Energy) but is also abbreviated informally as "DoEd".

Purpose and functions

Unlike the systems of many other countries, education in the United States is decentralized. Due to the courts and lawmakers' interpretation of the 10th Amendment, this means the federal government and Department of Education are not involved in determining curricula or educational standards or establishing schools or colleges. The Department of Defense Education Activity (DoDEA) oversees schools located on American military bases and the Department of the Interior's Bureau of Indian Education supports tribally-controlled schools. The quality of higher education institutions and their degrees are maintained through an informal private process known as accreditation, over which the Department of Education has no direct public jurisdictional control. 

The Department identifies four key functions:

 Establishing policies on federal financial aid for education, and distributing as well as monitoring those funds.
 Collecting data on America's schools and disseminating research.
 Focusing national attention on key educational issues.
 Prohibiting discrimination and ensuring equal access to education.

The Department of Education is a member of the United States Interagency Council on Homelessness, and works with federal partners to ensure proper education for homeless and runaway youth in the United States.

Budget

For 2006, the ED discretionary budget was $56 billion and the mandatory budget contained $23 billion. In 2009 it received additional ARRA funding of $102 billion. As of 2011, the discretionary budget is $70 billion.

History

Establishment
The Department's origin goes back to 1867, when President Andrew Johnson signed legislation for a Department of Education. It was seen as a way to collect information and statistics about the nation's schools and provide advice to schools in the same way the Department of Agriculture helped farmers. The Department was originally proposed by Henry Barnard and leaders of the National Teachers Association (renamed the National Education Association). Barnard served as the first commissioner of education but resigned when the office was reconfigured as a bureau in the Department of Interior known as the United States Office of Education due to concerns it would have too much control over local schools.

Over the years, the office remained relatively small, operating under different titles and housed in various agencies, including the United States Department of the Interior and the former United States Department of Health Education and Welfare (DHEW) (now the United States Department of Health and Human Services (DHHS)). An unsuccessful attempt at creating a Department of Education, headed by a Secretary of Education, came with the Smith–Towner Bill in 1920.  

In 1939, the organization (then a bureau) was transferred to the Federal Security Agency, where it was renamed as the Office of Education. After World War II, President Dwight D. Eisenhower promulgated "Reorganization Plan No. 1 of 1953." The Federal Security Agency was abolished and most of its functions were transferred to the newly formed DHEW.

In 1979, President Carter advocated for creating a cabinet-level Department of Education. Carter's plan was to transfer most of the Department of Health, Education, and Welfare's education-related functions to the Department of Education. Carter also planned to transfer the education-related functions of the departments of Defense, Justice, Housing and Urban Development, and Agriculture, as well as a few other federal entities. Among the federal education-related programs that were not proposed to be transferred were Headstart, the Department of Agriculture's school lunch and nutrition programs, the Department of the Interior's Native Americans' education programs, and the Department of Labor's education and training programs.

Upgrading Education to cabinet-level status in 1979 was opposed by many in the Republican Party, who saw the department as unconstitutional, arguing that the Constitution doesn't mention education, and deemed it an unnecessary and illegal federal bureaucratic intrusion into local affairs. However, many see the department as constitutional under the Commerce Clause, and that the funding role of the department is constitutional under the Taxing and Spending Clause. The National Education Association supported the bill, while the American Federation of Teachers opposed it.

As of 1979, the Office of Education had 3,000 employees and an annual budget of $12 billion. Congress appropriated to the Department of Education an annual budget of $14 billion and 17,000 employees when establishing the Department of Education. During the 1980 presidential campaign, Gov. Reagan called for the total elimination of the U.S. Department of Education, severe curtailment of bilingual education, and massive cutbacks in the federal role in education. Once in office, President Reagan significantly reduced its budget.

Early history
The Republican Party platform of 1980 called for the elimination of the Department of Education created under Carter, and President Ronald Reagan promised during the 1980 presidential election to eliminate it as a cabinet post, but he was not able to do so with a Democratic House of Representatives. In the 1982 State of the Union Address, he pledged: "The budget plan I submit to you on Feb. 8 will realize major savings by dismantling the Department of Education."

By 1984 the GOP had dropped the call for elimination from its platform, and with the election of President George H. W. Bush in 1988, the Republican position evolved in almost lockstep with that of the Democrats, with Goals 2000 a virtual joint effort.

After the Newt Gingrich-led "revolution" in 1994 had taken control of both Houses of Congress, federal control of and spending on education soared. That trend continued unabated despite the fact that the Republican Party made abolition of the department a cornerstone of 1996 platform and campaign promises, calling it an inappropriate federal intrusion into local, state, and family affairs. The GOP platform read: "The Federal government has no constitutional authority to be involved in school curricula or to control jobs in the market place. This is why we will abolish the Department of Education, end federal meddling in our schools, and promote family choice at all levels of learning."

In 2000, the Republican Liberty Caucus passed a resolution to abolish the Department of Education. Abolition of the organization was not pursued under the George W. Bush administration, which made reform of federal education a key priority of the president's first term. In 2008 and 2012, presidential candidate Ron Paul campaigned in part on an opposition to the department.

Later history 

Under President George W. Bush, the department primarily focused on elementary and secondary education, expanding its reach through the No Child Left Behind Act. The department's budget increased by $14 billion between 2002 and 2004, from $46 billion to $60 billion.

On March 23, 2007, President George W. Bush signed into law , which designates the ED Headquarters building as the Lyndon Baines Johnson Department of Education Building.

In December 2015 President Barack Obama instituted the Every Student Succeeds Act, which reauthorized the Elementary Secondary Education Act. “In December 2015, the Every Student Succeeds Act (ESSA) was signed into law, reauthorizing the Elementary and Secondary Education Act (ESEA) and replacing the No Child Left Behind Act (NCLB). ESEA, the federal law that authorizes federal funding for K-12 schools, represents the nation’s commitment to equal educational opportunity for all students and has influenced the education of millions of children."

Organization

See also

 Council for Higher Education Accreditation
 Educational attainment in the United States
 Free Application for Federal Student Aid
 FICE code
 Federal Student Aid
 National Diffusion Network
 School Improvement Grant
 Title 34 of the Code of Federal Regulations
 National Endowment for the Humanities

Related legislation 
 1965: Elementary and Secondary Education Act (ESEA)
 1965: Higher Education Act of 1965 (HEA) (Pub. L. No. 89-329)
 1974: Family Educational Rights and Privacy Act (FERPA)
 1974: Equal Educational Opportunities Act of 1974 (EEOA)
 1975: Education for All Handicapped Children Act (EHA) (Pub. L. No. 94-142)
 1978: Protection of Pupil Rights Amendment
 1980: Department of Education Organization Act (Pub. L. No. 96-88)
 1984: Equal Access Act
 1990: The Jeanne Clery Disclosure of Campus Security Policy and Campus Crime Statistics Act (Clery Act)
 1994: Improving America's Schools Act of 1994
 2001: No Child Left Behind Act (NCLB)
 2004: Individuals with Disabilities Education Act (IDEA)
 2005: Higher Education Reconciliation Act of 2005 (HERA) (Pub. L. No. 109-171)
 2006: Carl D. Perkins Career and Technical Education Improvement Act
 2007: America COMPETES Act
 2008: Higher Education Opportunity Act (HEOA) (Pub. L. No. 110-315)
 2009: Race to the Top
 2009: Student Aid and Fiscal Responsibility Act
 2010: Health Care and Education Reconciliation Act of 2010
 2015: Every Student Succeeds Act (ESSA)

References

Further reading
 Radin, Beryl A., and Willis D. Hawley (1988). Politics of Federal Reorganization: Creating the U.S. Department of Education, 
 Heffernan, Robert V. (2001). Cabinetmakers: Story of the Three-Year Battle to Establish the U.S. Department of Education,

Primary sources
 Examining the Policies and Priorities of the U.S. Department of Education. Hearing before the Committee on Education and Labor. U.S. House of Representatives, One Hundred Sixteenth Congress, First Session (April 10, 2019). (2020) online

External links

 
 Department of Education on USAspending.gov
 Department of Education in the Federal Register
 Department of Education reports and recommendations from the Government Accountability Office
 ERIC Digests – Informational digests on educational topics produced by the U.S. Department of Education before 1983.
 
 
 United States Government Manual, Department of Education 

 
Department Of Education
Education ministries
Government agencies established in 1979
Education